Wiegandt is a surname and may refer to:
Ardell Wiegandt (born 1940), Canadian football coach
Axel Wiegandt (1888–1947), Swedish runner
Jan Wiegandt, Band member, see List of Red Warszawa band members
Morten Wiegandt Sørensen (born 1979), Danish squash player
Patrick Von Wiegandt, American engineer
Scott Wiegandt, Athletic Director and baseball player